Muro: Damn the Humanist Inside is a 2008 Turkish comedy film, directed by Zübeyr Şaşmaz, starring Mustafa Üstündağ and Şefik Onatoğlu as two revolutionaries recently released from prison, who stumble across an illegal organization run by a former friend. It is a spin-off from the Valley of the Wolves media franchise, based on the Turkish television series of the same name using characters from the sequel series Valley of the Wolves: Ambush.

Synopsis
Muro (Mustafa Üstündağ) and Çeto (Şefik Onatoğlu), just released from prison, decide to return to their hometown to start a grassroots revolution. The first phase of their plan is to find two girls, get married and start their own families to become good exemplars of revolutionists. However, a surprise awaits them in their hometown. The village head has married Muro and Çeto to two Russian women while they were in prison. The two now have to return to İstanbul to find the women to whom they were married and get divorces if they want to realize their ideals. But on their return to the big city, they stumble across a massive illegal organization that they will never be able to decipher.

Cast
 Mustafa Üstündağ as Muro
 Şefik Onatoğlu as Çeto
 Eray Türk as Yıldırım
 Selim Erdoğan as Muzo
 Nataliya Bondarenko as Olga
 Daria Litinova as Anna
 Evrim Alasya as Fidan
 Bülent Şakrak 
 Demir Karahan

Release

Reception
The movie was number two at the Turkish box office for two weeks running and was the third highest grossing Turkish film of 2009 with a total gross of $11,602,503. It remained in the Turkish box-office charts for seventeen weeks and made a total worldwide gross of $14,073,100.

References

External links
 

2008 comedy films
2008 films
Valley of the Wolves
2000s Turkish-language films
Films set in Turkey
Films set in Istanbul
Turkish comedy films
2000s action comedy films
Film spin-offs